Roosevelt Township may refer to:

 Roosevelt Township, Pocahontas County, Iowa, in Pocahontas County, Iowa
 Roosevelt Township, Decatur County, Kansas
 Roosevelt Township, Beltrami County, Minnesota
 Roosevelt Township, Crow Wing County, Minnesota
 Roosevelt Township, Renville County, North Dakota, in Renville County, North Dakota

Township name disambiguation pages